The 1992–93 Azadegan League was the second season of the Azadegan League that was won by PAS Tehran. The final results of the 1992–93 Azadegan League, Iran's top division league, are listed below.

Group stage

Knockout stage

Semi-finals

|}

Final

Final standings

Notes
 Azadegan League champions: Pas Tehran
 Relegated teams to 2nd Division: Koma Shiraz, Aboumoslem, Sepirood Rasht, Vahdat Sari, Polyacryl
 Relegated teams to 3rd Division: Esteghlal Tehran
 Promoted teams: Saipa F.C., Zob Ahan, Chooka Talesh, Sepahan
 Top Goalscorer: Jamshid Shahmohammadi (Keshavarz) 11 Goals

References

Azadegan League seasons
Iran
1992–93 in Iranian football